Rapatona Rural LLG is a local-level government (LLG) of Manus Province, Papua New Guinea.

Wards
01. Mokarah
02. Hahai
03. Tong
04. Nauna (Nauna language speakers)
05. Polobuli
06. Kuluo
07. Penchal
08. Lenkau (Lenkau language speakers)
09. Mouklen

References

Local-level governments of Manus Province